Ostrovo may refer to:

Arnissa, a town in Greece formerly called Ostrovo
 Ostrovo, Croatia, a village near Markušica, Vukovar-Syrmia County, Croatia
Ostrovo, Veliko Gradište, a village in Serbia
Ostrovo, Požarevac, a village in Serbia
Ostrovo (island), a river island in Serbia
Ostrovo, Bulgaria, a village in Razgrad Province, Bulgaria
Ostrovo (Skopje), a part of Skopje, Macedonia
 Lake Ostrovo or Lake Vergoritis in Macedonia, northern Greece